The Women's slalom competition at the FIS Alpine World Ski Championships 2021 was held on 20 February. A qualification was scheduled for 19 February 2021, but got cancelled.

Results
The first run was started at 10:00, and the second run at 13:30.

References

Women's slalom